Polasara is a town and a notified area council in Ganjam district in the Indian state of Odisha.

Geography
It has an average elevation of 66 metres (216 feet).

Demographics
 India census, Polasara had a population of 23,119 of which 11,876 are males while 11,243 are females. Female Sex Ratio is of 947 against state average of 979. Moreover, Child Sex Ratio in Polasara is around 872 compared to Orissa state average of 941. Literacy rate of Polasara city is 78.63% higher than state average of 72.87%. In Polasara, Male literacy is around 87.05% while female literacy rate is 69.84%. .

Climate and regional setting
Maximum summer temperature is 37 °C; minimum winter temperature is 16 °C. The mean daily temperature varies from 33 °C to 38 °C. May is the hottest month; December is the coldest. The average annual rainfall is 1250 mm and the region receives monsoon and torrential rainfall from July to October.

Education
Polasara has the following schools and educational institutions:
 Govt. Elementary Teachers' Education Institute
 Gopabandhu High School
 Lingaraj Girls' High School
 ME School, Ranipada
 Balukeswara High School, Ranipada
 Polasara Degree Science College
 BITM, Tota Street
 CSC Academy
 Regional Women's College
 Nehuru Upper Primary School, Lunighati
 Kanak Durga Bidya Peetha, Madhusudanpur
 Purushottam High School, Kalamba
 Budheisuni Gothali High School, Budheisuni
 Saraswati Sisu Vidya Mandira, Kali Mandira Sahi
 U.G. High School, Ustapada
 Saraswati Sishu Bidya Mandir
 MSV Public School
 St.Xavier High School
 Odisha Adarsh Vidyalaya,Hatiota

Temples 

 Jagannath Temple
 Rameswar Temple
 Kali Maa Temple
 Kandhuni Devi Temple
 Maa Ratni Temple
 New Jagannath Temple
 Hanuman temple
 Bankeswar tample
 Balukeswar tample
 Radha krishna tample
 Langaleswar tample

References

Cities and towns in Ganjam district